Franck Goldnadel (born 1969), former director of Paris-Charles de Gaulle Airport, in France.
 Gilles-William Goldnadel (born 1954), French and Israeli lawyer, author and columnist.
 Jordan Goldnadel (born 1989), French film director, screenwriter, producer and actor.